Godzimir or Godemir - is a very old Slavic given name meaning: godzi/gode - "to do something at appropriate time", mir - "peace, world, prestige". Feminine form: Godzimira/Godemira. Alternate form of this name is: Mirogod.

The name may refer to: 

 Godzimir Małachowski - a Polish lawyer and university professor
 Godemir - ban of Croatia, ca. AD 1000

See also

Slavic names

Slavic masculine given names
Croatian masculine given names
Polish masculine given names